Fawley may refer to:

Places in the United Kingdom
 Fawley, Berkshire, a village and civil parish in West Berkshire
 South Fawley (or Little Fawley), a village in Berkshire
 Fawley, Buckinghamshire, a village in Buckinghamshire
 Fawley Bottom, a small village in south Buckinghamshire
 Fawley, Hampshire, a village in Hampshire
 Fawley Refinery
 Fawley Chapel, a village in Herefordshire

People with the surname
 Ben Fawley, confessed murderer of Taylor Behl, 2006
 Willis Fawley (born 1929), English rugby league footballer of the 1960s and 1970s

Fictional people
 Jude Fawley, the main character in the novel Jude the Obscure by Thomas Hardy

Other
 SS Empire Fawley, the original name of SS Clan Mackinlay, built in 1945
Fawley Court, a manor house and estate in Fawley, Buckinghamshire, U.K.
Fawley branch line, a railway line to Fawley, Hampshire, U.K.
Fawley A.F.C., a football club based in Fawley, Hampshire, U.K.
Fawley Power Station, between the villages of Fawley and Calshot in Hampshire, U.K.